"Blue Vibes" is a song by Polish singer Margaret. It was recorded to promote the Polish-language version of the 2017 animated feature film, Smurfs: The Lost Village. The song was also included on Margaret's third studio album Monkey Business (2017). The single was released on 17 March 2017, only in Poland. It was written by Joakim Buddee, Ingrid Hägglund, Margaret and Dimitri Stassos, and produced by Stassos and Buddee.

Music video
A music video for "Blue Vibes", released on 17 March 2017, was directed by Konrad Aksinowicz. The video features scenes filmed in a studio with Margaret and a person dressed as Smurfette dancing on a baby pink background, as well as scenes from Smurfs: The Lost Village.

Critical reception
Wiwibloggs Chris Halpin wrote that the song "doesn't really stray too far out of Margaret's latest offerings. It's perhaps a little more chilled compared to "Elephant, with less of the aggressive drums and a more summery feel to the beat. ... The song also doesn't tie itself in to the Smurfs at all: this isn't a theme song, merely a riff. We're thinking "Can't Stop the Feeling!" here, y'all. It's a grown up track that suits Margaret's vocal and doesn't sacrifice to fit a PR campaign, but is merely enhanced by it." Mike Wass of Idolator believed that "this ridiculous euro-pop anthem is even catchier" than "I'm a Lady" by Meghan Trainor, a track also recorded for Smurfs: The Lost Village.

Track listing

Release history

References

2017 singles
2017 songs
Magic Records singles
Margaret (singer) songs
Songs written by Dimitri Stassos
Songs written by Margaret (singer)
The Smurfs music